The 2014 GP3 Series was the fifth season of the third-tier of Formula One feeder championship and also fifth season under the moniker of GP3 Series, a motor racing feeder series for Formula One and sister series GP2. The series continued to use Pirelli tyres.

The title was claimed by Red Bull Junior driver Alex Lynn, despite the fact he had fewer wins than Dean Stoneman; Lynn surpassed him by 44 points.

This was also the only season in the GP3 Series in which a team other than ART Grand Prix secured the constructors' title, with Carlin winning the constructors' championship by 17 points over ART.

Teams and drivers
The following teams competed in the 2014 season:

Driver changes

Entering/Re-entering GP3
 German Formula Three driver Emil Bernstorff made his debut in the series, driving for Carlin.
 Former Indy Lights driver Victor Carbone moved to the series with Trident.
 Alfonso Celis Jr. joined the series with Status Grand Prix.
 Having been without a drive for 2013, Roman de Beer joined the series for 2014, racing with Trident.
 German Formula Three champion Marvin Kirchhöfer competes for ART Grand Prix in his first year in the series.
 Alex Lynn, who finished third in the 2013 European Formula 3 Championship, moved into the series – as a Red Bull Junior Team member – with Carlin.
 Jann Mardenborough moved from the FIA European Formula Three Championship to the GP3 Series, racing for Arden International.
 Nelson Mason joined the series with Hilmer Motorsport, after competing in the European F3 Open Championship.
 Denis Nagulin enters the series with Trident, having finished 19th in the 2013 European F3 Open season.
 After competing in the last round of the 2013 GP3 Series season with Koiranen GP, Dean Stoneman move into the series full-time with Marussia Manor Racing.
 Porsche Supercup driver Richie Stanaway returned to the series with Status Grand Prix. Stanaway had a win at Spa with ART in 2011.
 Ivan Taranov graduated from the Protyre Formula Renault Championship to GP3 with Hilmer Motorsport.
 Mathéo Tuscher, who contested a single round of the Formula Renault 3.5 Series in 2013, made his series début with Jenzer Motorsport.
 Santiago Urrutia, who placed fourth in European F3 Open, joined the series with Koiranen GP.
 Pål Varhaug, who won the inaugural GP3 race in 2010, returned to the series with Jenzer Motorsport, the team he competed with in 2010.
 Beitske Visser graduated from the ADAC Formel Masters to the GP3 Series, racing with Hilmer Motorsport.

Changing teams
 After completing the 2013 season with Status Grand Prix, Jimmy Eriksson switched to Koiranen GP.
 Adderly Fong moved from Status Grand Prix to Jenzer Motorsport.
 Carmen Jordá switched from Bamboo Engineering to Koiranen GP.
 Patrick Kujala moved to Marussia Manor Racing after competing his debut season with Koiranen GP.
 Patric Niederhauser joined Arden International after two seasons with Jenzer Motorsport.
 Jenzer Motorsport's Alex Fontana and Marussia Manor Racing's Dino Zamparelli moved to ART Grand Prix.
 Nick Yelloly, who competed for Carlin switched to Status Grand Prix.

Leaving GP3
 Robert Cregan, Samin Gómez, Eric Lichtenstein, Melville McKee, Aaro Vainio and Lewis Williamson left the series after failing to secure seats in 2014.
 Both Conor Daly and Tio Ellinas graduated to the GP2 Series.
 David Fumanelli moved to the Blancpain Sprint Series.
 Jack Harvey left the championship to contest Indy Lights.
 Kevin Korjus left the GP3 Series and instead moved to the European Le Mans Series.
 2013 GP3 champion, MW Arden driver Daniil Kvyat stepped up to Formula One, racing with Scuderia Toro Rosso.
 Facu Regalia left the GP3 Series and move to parent series GP2 with Hilmer Motorsport.
 Carlos Sainz Jr. moved into the Formula Renault 3.5 Series full-time for 2014.
 Alexander Sims switched to the British GT Championship.
 Giovanni Venturini switched to sports car racing to compete for Eurotech Engineering in International GT Open.
 Josh Webster, who drove for Status Grand Prix in 2013, left the series and switched to Porsche Carrera Cup Great Britain.
 Trident's Emanuele Zonzini moved to the Italian GT Championship.

Mid-season changes
 Russian driver Nikolay Martsenko replaced his compatriot Ivan Taranov at Hilmer Motorsport for the round at the Red Bull Ring, after hitting funding problems which curtailed his campaign in the Formula Renault 3.5 Series. Riccardo Agostini also joined Hilmer at the Red Bull Ring, as he replaced Beitske Visser.
 German driver Sebastian Balthasar replaced Nikolay Martsenko at Hilmer Motorsport for the round at Silverstone, while Australian Mitchell Gilbert replaced Russian Denis Nagulin at Trident at the same round.
 Austrian driver Christopher Höher replaced Hong Kong-based Adderly Fong at Jenzer Motorsport for the round at the Hungaroring, as Fong had a race in the Audi R8 LMS Cup that weekend. Kevin Ceccon replaced Höher for the next round at the Circuit de Spa-Francorchamps.
 Trident replaced their whole line-up for the round at Spa-Francorchamps. Instead of Victor Carbone, Roman de Beer and Mitchell Gilbert, the team fielded Konstantin Tereshchenko, John Bryant-Meisner and Luca Ghiotto.
 Marussia Manor Racing pulled out of the Sochi round due to financial troubles. Marussia drivers Patrick Kujala and Dean Stoneman signed with Trident and Koiranen GP respectively, while Ryan Cullen did the same move as Kujala in Abu Dhabi.
 Kang Ling made his GP3 Series début at Abu Dhabi with Trident.

Team changes
 Bamboo Engineering left series after the last race of the 2013 season. Their place was due to be taken by GP2 Series champions Russian Time, but after Motopark Academy parted ways with the team after the death of team founder Igor Mazepa, their place was taken by GP2 Series team Hilmer Motorsport.
 MW Arden changed its name to Arden International and was re-registered as a British, rather than an Australian team. The changes coincided with Mark Webber's retirement from Formula One and subsequent move to the FIA World Endurance Championship.

Calendar
After the final race of the 2013 GP3 season, series organisers announced that the 2014 championship would include an event in Russia, supporting the 2014 Russian Grand Prix. On 6 December 2013, the full 2014 calendar was revealed with nine events, including races in Austria for the first time.

Calendar changes
 The stand-alone round at the Circuit Ricardo Tormo, introduced in 2013, was discontinued for 2014.
 The GP3 Series visited two circuits — the Red Bull Ring in Austria and the Sochi Autodrom in Russia — for the first time in 2014.

Results

Championship standings
Scoring system
Points were awarded to the top 10 classified finishers in the race 1, and to the top 8 classified finishers in the race 2. The pole-sitter in the race 1 also received four points, and two points were given to the driver who set the fastest lap inside the top ten in both the race 1 and race 2. No extra points were awarded to the pole-sitter in the race 2.

Race 1 points

Race 2 points
Points were awarded to the top 8 classified finishers.

Drivers' championship

Notes:
† — Drivers did not finish the race, but were classified as they completed over 90% of the race distance.

Teams' championship

Notes:
† — Drivers did not finish the race, but were classified as they completed over 90% of the race distance.

Footnotes

References

External links
 

GP3
GP3 Series seasons
GP3
GP3 Series